Ethylphenol (4-EP) is an organic compound with the formula C2H5C6H4OH.  It is one of three isomeric ethylphenols. A white solid, it occurs as an impurity in xylenols and as such is used in the production of some commercial phenolic resins.  It is also a precursor to 4-vinylphenol.

Natural occurrences 
In wine and beer, 4-EP is produced by the yeast Brettanomyces. At concentrations greater than 140 μg/L (typical sensory threshold) it gives the wine aromas described as barnyard, medicinal, band-aids, and mousy. In certain Belgian beer styles, a high 4-EP level may be desirable; however, very high levels of the compound in wine can render it undrinkable. The level of 4-EP is roughly proportional to Brettanomyces concentration and activity, and can therefore be used as an indicator of the yeast's presence. There are significant differences between strains of Brettanomyces in their ability to produce 4-EP.

4-EP is also a component of castoreum, the exudate from the castor sacs of the mature North American beaver (Castor canadensis) and the Eurasian beaver (Castor fiber), used in perfumery.

Biochemistry
4-EP is biosynthesized in two steps from p-coumaric acid.  Decarboxylation gives 4-vinylphenol as catalyzed by the enzyme cinnamate decarboxylase. 4-Vinylphenol is further reduced to 4-ethylphenol by the enzyme vinyl phenol reductase. Coumaric acid is sometimes added to microbiological media, enabling the positive identification of Brettanomyces by smell.

See also 
 4-Ethylguaiacol
 Yeast in winemaking
 Wine fault
 Wine chemistry

References

External links 
4-Ethylphenol oral toxicity data

Alkylphenols